Syngrapha diasema is a moth of the family Noctuidae first described by Jean Baptiste Boisduval in 1829. It is found from northern Fennoscandia to Siberia, across the Arctic and subarctic. In North America, it has been reported across the Arctic and subarctic from Labrador to central Alaska.

The wingspan is 30–33 mm. Adults are on wing in July depending on the location. There is one generation per year.

The larvae feed on Betula species (including Betula nana) and Vaccinium and Populus species, as well as Trollius europaeus.

External links

Plusiinae
Moths of Europe
Moths of Asia
Moths of North America
Moths described in 1829